This is the discography of acid jazz and funk group the Brand New Heavies.

Albums

Studio albums

Live albums

Compilation albums

Remix albums

Singles

Songs featured on soundtracks
1992: "People Get Ready (Remix)" in Juice
1994: "Close to You" in Prêt-à-Porter
1994: "Higher Learning/Time for Change" in Higher Learning
1996: "World Keeps Spinning" in The Truth About Cats & Dogs
1997: "I Like It" in Love Jones 
1998: "More Love" in Sliding Doors
1999: “Midnight at the Oasis” in American Pie
2006: "Jump n' Move" in Happy Feet

Notes

References

Jazz discographies
Funk music discographies